Victor Otto Oehrn (21 October 1907-Gədəbəy, Azerbaijan – 26 December 1997-Bonn, Germany) was a Fregattenkapitän with the Kriegsmarine during World War II.

Career
In August 1939 he joined the staff of BdU as an Admiralstabsoffizier.

From November 1941 Oehrn served on the Mediterranean U-boat staff, but during a mission to North Africa in July 1942, he was severely wounded and captured. After recovering at a British Military Hospital in Alexandria, Oehrn was sent to POW Camp 306 on the Suez Canal. He returned to Germany in October 1943 after being released in a prisoner exchange. Oehrn spent the remainder of the war serving on the staff in a number of posts.

Awards
 Sudetenland Medal (20 December 1939)
 Iron Cross (1939)
 2nd Class (27 January 1940)
 1st Class (10 June 1940)
 Italian Croce al Merito di Guerra with Swords (2 November 1941)
 Italian Croce di guerra al valore militare (28 January 1942)
 Knight's Cross of the Iron Cross on 21 October 1940 as Kapitänleutnant and commander of U-37

References

Notes

Bibliography

 
 
 

1907 births
1997 deaths
U-boat commanders (Kriegsmarine)
Recipients of the Knight's Cross of the Iron Cross
Reichsmarine personnel
Recipients of the War Merit Cross (Italy)
Recipients of the War Cross for Military Valor